Avdo Humo (1 February 1914 – 24 January 1983) was a Yugoslav and Bosnian communist politician, writer and an Order of the People's Hero recipient.

Humo held highest positions in the Socialist Republic of Bosnia and Herzegovina. In 1972, Humo and Osman Karabegović came into conflict with the leadership of the League of Communists of Bosnia and Herzegovina, accusing it for the establishment of "undemocratic relations" and the introduction of a "strong-arm led regime". This led to Humo and Karabegović being stripped of their posts.

Biography
Humo was born in Mostar on 1 February 1914. He joined the revolutionary movement while he attended high school in gymnasium in Mostar. Because he was expelled from the gymnasium in Mostar, he continued his education in Bihać. Subsequently, he enrolled the University of Belgrade Faculty of Philology, where he obtained a degree in world and Yugoslav literature. At the University, he was one of the organizers and participants in actions of the socialist-oriented students. He became a member of SKOJ in 1934 and a member of the Communist Party of Yugoslavia in 1935. He organized students of Bosnia and Herzegovina into the "Petar Kočić" youth society and the "Neretva" section where members of Communist Party were also active.

Humo was one of the most prominent party members before World War II in Yugoslavia. In 1940 he became a member of the Regional Committee of Communist Party for Bosnia and Herzegovina. He was also one of the resistance organizers in Herzegovina against Axis forces. Because he was educated and well read, Humo was nicknamed "Kulturni" by his comrades. His nickname, "kulturni" in Serbo-Croatian and Bosnian can loosely be translated as polite, cultured or well-read.  Listening to command he moved to Sarajevo and continued his activity there. As the party's Vice-President he participated in the First and Second Assembly of ZAVNOBiH. He was also a member of the AVNOJ.

Humo was a founding member of the famous Bosnian newspaper Oslobođenje. He served on various party and state positions, including as the President of the Executive Council of PR Bosnia and Herzegovina (de facto Prime Minister). He was proclaimed People's Hero of Yugoslavia on 27 November 1953. In 1972, he was dismissed along with Osman Karabegović from their posts for alleged Muslim "exclusivism" and "nationalism."

Avdo Humo died on 24 January 1983 in Opatija, Yugoslavia

Personal life
Humo married Olga Ninčić, daughter of Momčilo Ninčić, a prominent politician of the Kingdom of Yugoslavia and former President of the Assembly of the League of Nations. His wife was a secretary of Yugoslav President Josip Broz Tito through the war. Bosnian writer Hamza Humo was his uncle.

References
Notes

Books

 
 
 

1914 births
1983 deaths
Finance ministers of Yugoslavia
Prime Ministers of Bosnia and Herzegovina
Politicians from Mostar
Yugoslav Partisans members
Yugoslav politicians
Yugoslav writers
Bosnia and Herzegovina people of World War II
Bosnia and Herzegovina atheists
Writers from Mostar
Recipients of the Order of the People's Hero
League of Communists of Bosnia and Herzegovina politicians
University of Belgrade Faculty of Philology alumni
Bosnia and Herzegovina writers